Jaime Jesús Echenique Salinas (born April 27, 1997) is a Colombian professional basketball player for the Motor City Cruise of the NBA G League. He played college basketball for the Trinity Valley Community College Cardinals and the Wichita State Shockers.

Early life and high school career
Echenique grew up in Barranquilla, Colombia and joined a street gang called the LBs which was headed by a cousin. Echenique gravitated towards basketball after playing baseball at a young age. He attended IED Pestalozzi and led its basketball team to four straight regional championships. As a junior and senior, Echenique was named region MVP. After graduating from high school in December 2015, he received several offers to play professionally in Europe, but his father forced him to turn them down to focus on academics. With the idea of playing college basketball in the United States, Echenique joined an amateur club in Medellín and, two months later, a club in Bogotá that had international connections and helped him acquire a visa for the United States. Guy Furr, the head coach of Trinity Valley Community College, was informed of Echenique's talent by two Colombians on the roster, and he invited Echenique to Texas to work out.

College career

Trinity Valley CC
Echenique arrived in Dallas, Texas with no money and not speaking English fluently. He impressed coach Furr with his potential and received a scholarship from Trinity Valley Community College. During his freshman season, Echenique did not have much confidence and struggled with his conditioning, having never been pushed to exhaustion before. Nonetheless, he started 26 games as a freshman and averaged 9.2 points and 5.4 rebounds per game. As a sophomore, Echenique averaged 9.1 points and 6.1 rebounds per game. In his sophomore season, a friend invited him to visit Wichita State and he became fond of the city of Wichita, Kansas. Echenique committed to the Shockers over offers from Baylor, Cincinnati, Western Kentucky, Illinois, and New Mexico.

Wichita State

After Echenique arrived at Wichita State, he collapsed after a workout, prompting him so see a cardiologist to see if he had a heart condition. The examination proved that his heart was healthy, Echenique just needed to work through his conditioning. As a junior, he averaged 9.2 points, 6.0 rebounds, and 1.4 blocks per game. Echenique considered redshirting his senior season, an idea coach Gregg Marshall rejected. He missed several games in the beginning of the season with a fractured hand. He posted season-highs of 20 points and 13 rebounds on January 15, 2020, in a 65–53 loss to Temple. On February 20, Echenique tied a career-high of 20 points and had a career-best 12-of-14 shooting from the foul line, along with nine rebounds, four blocks and two steals in a 65–55 victory over South Florida. As a senior, Echenique averaged 11.3 points, 7.1 rebounds and 1.6 blocks per game. He earned Second Team All-AAC honors.

Professional career

Acunsa GBC (2020–2021)
On August 11, 2020, Echenique signed his first professional contract with Acunsa GBC of the Spanish Liga ACB. He made his debut with the team on September 19, recording 10 points and four rebounds in an 86–70 loss to Real Madrid. He averaged 12 points and four rebounds per game.

Capital City Go-Go / Washington Wizards (2021–2022)
In August 2021, Echenique joined the Washington Wizards for the 2021 NBA Summer League and on September 21, he signed with the Wizards. Echenique was waived on October 16.  In October 2021, he joined the Capital City Go-Go as an affiliate player. Echenique averaged 12.6 points and 9.2 rebounds per game while shooting 55.4 percent from the floor. On December 30, 2021, he signed a 10-day contract with the Washington Wizards. On the same day, he made his NBA debut in a 110-93 win over the Cleveland Cavaliers, making him the first Colombian in NBA history. On January 9, 2022, Echenique was reacquired by the Capital City Go-Go.

Motor City Cruise (2022–present)
On December 22, 2022, Echenique was traded from the Capital City Go-Go to the Motor City Cruise.

Career statistics

NBA

|-
| style="text-align:left;"| 
| style="text-align:left;"| Washington
| 1 || 0 || 3.0 || — || — || .500 || .0 || .0 || .0 || .0 || .0
|- class="sortbottom"
| style="text-align:center;" colspan="2"| Career
| 1 || 0 || 3.0 || — || — || .500 || .0 || .0 || .0 || .0 || .0

College

NCAA Division I

|-
| style="text-align:left;"| 2018–19
| style="text-align:left;"| Wichita State
| 37 || 34 || 17.9 || .543 || .387 || .649 || 6.0 || .4 || .5 || 1.4 || 9.2
|-
| style="text-align:left;"| 2019–20
| style="text-align:left;"| Wichita State
| 27 || 24 || 23.4 || .487 || .190 || .784 || 7.1 || .6 || .7 || 1.6 || 11.3
|- class="sortbottom"
| style="text-align:center;" colspan="2"| Career
| 64 || 58 || 20.2 || .516 || .308 || .719 || 6.4 || .4 || .6 || 1.5 || 10.1

JUCO

|-
| style="text-align:left;"| 2016–17
| style="text-align:left;"| Trinity Valley CC
| 31 || 26 || — || .613 || — || .750 || 5.4 || .2 || .4 || 1.2 || 9.2
|-
| style="text-align:left;"| 2017–18
| style="text-align:left;"| Trinity Valley CC
| 33 || 3 || — || .575 || .500 || .697 || 6.1 || .2 || .2 || 2.0 || 9.1
|- class="sortbottom"
| style="text-align:center;" colspan="2"| Career
| 64 || 29 || – || .593 || .500 || .721 || 5.8 || .2 || .3 || 1.6 || 9.1

Personal life
Echenique is the son of Jaime Echenique Sr. and Lidis Salinas. His mother is a chef in an Arabian restaurant while his father is a bus driver.

References

External links
Wichita State Shockers bio
Trinity Valley CC Cardinals bio

1997 births
Living people
Capital City Go-Go players
Centers (basketball)
Colombian expatriate basketball people in Spain
Colombian expatriate basketball people in the United States
Colombian men's basketball players
Gipuzkoa Basket players
Liga ACB players
Sportspeople from Barranquilla
Trinity Valley Cardinals men's basketball players
Undrafted National Basketball Association players
Washington Wizards players
Wichita State Shockers men's basketball players